Ngaere is a village situated on State Highway 3,  south of Stratford, New Zealand.  The name "Ngaere" literally means "swamp" in English, and before settlement, the area was covered by a vast and ancient wetland.

For a time, the name was spelt "Ngaire", but it was changed to its Maori spelling in 1909.

Attractions

"Ngaere Gardens", which once hosted a menagerie of exotic animals, was a popular picnic spot for early 20th century families. Several attempts at resurrecting the gardens have been to no avail.  The gardens have now been cleared, and all that remains now is the large lake, and a number of mature exotic trees.

Another well-known landmark is the Ngaere dairy factory, founded in 1914.  It produced its own brand of cheese called "Triumph". The Ngaere factory closed in 1973, after the Ngaere dairy cooperative merged into the Taranaki dairy cooperative. Since its closure, the factory has been put to many uses - as a clothing factory, an indoor cricket arena, a rave dance hall, and currently a saw mill.

Ngaere formerly had a service station, which closed in the 1990s.  The building has been put to a variety of uses, including as a brewery and a health shop. It is currently a motorcycle repair shop. "Fred's Place" is well known for its antiques.

Local Legends

Maori legend says that the Ngaere swamp was formed when Mt. Taranaki stopped and wept on its journey to its current resting place.  Most of the swamp was drained in the early 20th century for dairy farming.

Name

It has been speculated that Ngaere, which until 1909 was spelt Ngaire, is the origin of the name Ngaire, a common girl's name in New Zealand.

Education
Ngaere School is a coeducational full primary (years 1-8) school with a decile rating of 8 and a roll of 138. The school was founded in 1882.

Notes

External links
 Ngaere School website

Further reading

General historical works

Business history

A summary of this holding may be seen at 

Slightly related to the above (in that it involves a sawmill) are the dissenting letters from residents of Cheal and Windsor Roads to the a train operated by Inglewood businessman Henry Brown and the local Ngaire Sawmills. The letters date from 1897. See 

Architectural drawings for a curing room and accommodation house for the above company are housed within  in New Plymouth. They date from 1929. See

People

Some of the papers of Alistair and Mary Dickson are held within  in New Plymouth. The Dicksons farmed in the Ngaere district in the 1920s and 1930s. See 

The oral historian Alison Robinson interviewed Bruce and Jenny Clarke in 1992. They talk about their farm, Jenny's experience as a teacher (at Finnerty Road School), and the district in general. The interview is held within  in New Plymouth.  See 

The oral historian Alison Robinson interviewed Alf Willan in 1992. He talks about the district, Lowgarth, and the Lowgarth dairy co-operative (which later merged with the Ngaere Co-operative Dairy Company) The interview is held within  in New Plymouth.  See 

A typed manuscript by local farmer Henry Arthur Wood (1873-1956) chronicled his life draining and farming  swampy land in the Ngaere district. This document is held within  in New Plymouth.  See

Schools

The oral historian Alison Robinson interviewed Jenny Clarke in 1992. Jenny talks about her experience as a teacher (at Finnerty Road School). The interview is held within  in New Plymouth.  See 

Stratford District, New Zealand
Populated places in Taranaki